Amicus is Latin for 'friend' or 'comrade'. The word may refer to:

Organizations
 Amicus (trade union), the former British trade union, now merged with the TGWU to form Unite
 Amicus Bank, a former bank based in Canada
 Amicus Books, an independent bookstore in Marysville, California, US
 Amicus Productions, a British film production company
 Amicus (charity), a UK-based non-profit organization

Places
 Amicus, Illinois, a former name of Sciota, a village in Illinois, US
 Amicus, Virginia, an unincorporated community in Greene County, Virginia, US

People with the name
 Amicus, O.S.B. Roman Catholic monk, abbot, and cardinal (1117–1130)
 Bartholomeus Amicus (1562–1649), Jesuit priest, teacher, and writer
 William Alexander (Quaker) (1768-1841) English Quaker and publisher, who wrote under this name
 Peter Dodds McCormick (pen name: Amicus) (1834–1916), composer of Advance Australia Fair

Law
 Amicus curiae, a legal Latin phrase, literally translated as "friend of the court"
 Proximus amicus, a legal Latin phrase, literally translated as "next friend"

Other uses
 Project Amicus, a geosocial networking app
 Amicus, the former name of OnEarth, published by the Natural Resources Defense Council
 Amicus, a journal published by the Michigan State University College of Law
 Amicus (alga), a genus of green algae in the family Dasycladaceae
 Amicus (crustacean), a fossil genus of ostracods in the family Knoxitidae
 Advance Australia Fair, national anthem of Australia, Originally published under the pseudonym "Amicus".

See also
 Amica (disambiguation)
 Amico (disambiguation)
 Amiga (disambiguation)
 Amigo (disambiguation)